The 1948–49 NHL season was the 32nd season of the National Hockey League. In a rematch of the previous season, Toronto defeated Detroit in the Stanley Cup final to win the championship.

League business

Rule changes
A new rule, often called the "Durnan Rule", was introduced for the start of the season stating that goalies cannot be the captain or an alternate captain and wear the "C" or "A". Specifically, NHL Rule 14-D (today's rule 6.1) read: No playing Coach or playing Manager or goalkeeper shall be permitted to act as Captain or Alternate Captain.

This rule was introduced because Bill Durnan, Montreal Canadiens goalie and captain, would frequently leave his crease to dispute calls with the referees. Opposing teams claimed that this would give the Canadiens unscheduled timeouts during strategic points in games. It would be another sixty years before another goalie would be captain. From 2008 until 2010, the Vancouver Canucks had Roberto Luongo as their captain, the seventh goalie to serve as a captain in the NHL. The rule remained in place, however, and Luongo could not 'act' as captain during games.

Regular season
Don Gallinger of the Boston Bruins, hopeful he could win an appeal of his suspension in the gambling scandal, finally admitted to gambling and was expelled from the NHL for life in September.

On October 8, 1948, the New York Rangers were due to start their season against the Montreal Canadiens, when the team suffered misfortune. Buddy O'Connor, Frank Eddolls, Edgar Laprade, Bill Moe, and Tony Leswick were travelling in their car from Montreal to Saranac Lake, New York when their car was struck by a truck near Rouses Point. O'Connor suffered several broken ribs, Eddolls a severed tendon in his knee, Laprade suffered a broken nose, Moe had a cut in the head requiring several stitches and Leswick escaped with a few bruises.

On November 10, 1948, unseasonably warm temperatures caused a fog bank to occur inside the Boston Garden during a game between the Boston Bruins and Detroit Red Wings. Referee Bill Chadwick abandoned the game after only 9 minutes of the first period due to poor visibility. The game was replayed the following night, with Boston winning 4–1.

A league record of ten major penalties was set November 25, 1948, when 11,000 fans at the Montreal Forum witnessed a donnybrook. It started when the Habs' Ken Mosdell elbowed Maple Leaf Gus Mortson. Mortson retaliated by knocking Elliot de Grey down with his stick. Montreal's Maurice Richard then sprang onto Mortson's back and they fought, and then all hands joined in. Mortson, Richard, Toronto's Howie Meeker and Mosdell were banished with majors. Play had scarcely begun when Ken Reardon (Montreal) and Joe Klukay (Toronto) began fencing and Bill Barilko went at Reardon, while Klukay got into it with Billy Reay, and Hal Laycoe fought Garth Boesch. In the game itself, Turk Broda picked up his first shutout of the year as the Leafs won, 2–0.

Both Detroit and Montreal lost key players to injury this year. Montreal lost Elmer Lach with a fractured jaw when he collided with Toronto defenceman Bob Goldham, and Emile "Butch" Bouchard injured a knee. Detroit lost Gordie Howe, who underwent knee surgery.

Bill Durnan got hot in the second half of the season and recorded four consecutive shutouts, going 309 minutes and 21 seconds without giving up a goal. In all, Durnan had 10 shutouts and won his fifth Vezina Trophy in six years.

Final standings

Playoffs

Playoff bracket

Semifinals

(1) Detroit Red Wings vs. (3) Montreal Canadiens

(2) Boston Bruins vs. (4) Toronto Maple Leafs

Stanley Cup Finals

Awards

All-Star teams

Player statistics

Scoring leaders
Note: GP = Games played, G = Goals, A = Assists, PTS = Points, PIM = Penalties in minutes

Source: NHL

Leading goaltenders

Note: GP = Games played; Mins = Minutes played; GA = Goals against; GAA = Goals against average; W = Wins; L = Losses; T = Ties; SO = Shutouts

Coaches
Boston Bruins: Dit Clapper
Chicago Black Hawks: Charlie Conacher
Detroit Red Wings: Tommy Ivan
Montreal Canadiens: Dick Irvin
New York Rangers: Lynn Patrick
Toronto Maple Leafs: Hap Day

Debuts
The following is a list of players of note who played their first NHL game in 1948–49 (listed with their first team, asterisk(*) marks debut in playoffs):
Jack Gelineau, Boston Bruins
Dave Creighton, Boston Bruins

Last games
The following is a list of players of note who played their last game in the NHL in 1948–49 (listed with their last team):
Neil Colville, New York Rangers

See also
1948-49 NHL transactions
List of Stanley Cup champions
2nd National Hockey League All-Star Game
National Hockey League All-Star Game
1948 in sports
1949 in sports

References 
 
 
 
 
 
 
 

Notes

External links
 Hockey Database
 NHL.com

 
1948–49 in American ice hockey by league
1948–49 in Canadian ice hockey by league